Takin' Care of Business is an album led by American jazz saxophonist Charlie Rouse which was recorded in 1960 for the Jazzland label.

Reception

Scott Yanow of AllMusic calls the album "a fine modern mainstream jam session-flavored set".

Track listing
 "Blue Farouq" (Blue Mitchell) - 7:24     
 "204" (Randy Weston) - 7:24     
 "Upptankt" (Charlie Rouse) - 4:42     
 "Weirdо" (Kenny Drew) - 5:59     
 "Pretty Strange" (Weston) - 5:14     
 "They Didn't Believe Me" (Jerome Kern, Herbert Reynolds) - 6:52

Personnel 

Charlie Rouse - tenor saxophone
Blue Mitchell - trumpet (tracks 1-4 & 6)
Walter Bishop, Jr. - piano 
Earl May - bass
Art Taylor - drums

References 

1960 albums
Charlie Rouse albums
Jazzland Records (1960) albums
Albums produced by Orrin Keepnews